Sean Ensign (born 1972) is an American singer-songwriter.

Early life
The last born of eight children to Dr. James W. Ensign, Sean Ensign was born and raised in Cleveland, Ohio. From an early age, he learned to appreciate the value and beauty of music. He was inspired to pursue music from TV's Kids Incorporated. Ensign taught himself to play the piano. He took every chance that presented itself to sing, including high school musicals such as "Grease", "South Pacific", and "Bye, Bye, Birdie", where he played Conrad Birdie. However, it was not until he began writing his own songs at around age 16 that he was able to fully express himself emotionally and artistically.  Before releasing his first album "Finally", (later titled Finally: Reloaded) Ensign worked as an intensive care nurse and as a male fitness model. Sean took a short break from the music industry in 2013 to go to nursing anesthesia school, but since 2019, he has returned to music. Sean also works as a nurse anesthetist in Phoenix, Arizona for the Mayo Clinic. While under the pen name James Warren (named after his late father), Sean also wrote a fan-fiction novel called "Lost" based on the 1970s and 1990s Sid & Marty Krofft television series "Land of the Lost". This adaption (or reboot) retells the story of the Marshall family's epic adventures while trapped in another dimension with dinosaurs and dangerous creatures. Currently, he is working on an audio version of his first book and writing the second novel entitled, "Darkness".

Career
Ensign started on the road to becoming a successful singer and songwriter after being signed to the label, Titan Sounds. He soon began to make waves in the music world, particularly, the Club/Dance music industry. His debut single, "It's My Life (Finally)" peaked at Nunmber 35 on the Hot Dance Music/Club Play and Number 21 on the Hot Dance Singles Sales chart. The follow-up single, "Without You" saw greater success peaking at Number 4 on the Hot Dance Music/Club Play. Both songs are from his debut album, Finally which blends Hi-NRG music songs with passionate ballads. He also covered the Ace of Base song, "Everytime It Rains". Ensign's third single "Everytime It Rains" is in the works with an acoustic ballad version and many Club/Dance remixes done by other producers including Hex Hector for the CD single. The remixes are being sent to DJs and clubs in both Europe and the United States.

Sean released eight singles from his first studio album, all of which charted on various music charts around the world. All the releases included several remixes by famous DJs and music producers including Hex Hector, The Electric Allstars, and 7th Heaven Productions.

Sean more recently released his brand new album entitled, "Here We Go Again". A mix of pop, dance, R&B, EDM, country, and some folk. He has broadened his music horizons and grown as an artist over the years. His first two singles from the album "Talk to Me", and "Hero", are streaming all over the airways.

Discography
Finally 2006 Titan Sounds Music

Finally : Reloaded 2012 Titan Sounds Music
Here We Go Again 2021 Pop Life

Albums
 Finally 2006 Titan Sounds
 Finally Reloaded 2009
 Here We Go Again 2021 Pop Life

Singles

References

External links
 Official Author Website for his Land of the Lost Book Series
 Sean Ensign's Official Website
 Sean Ensign's Official Myspace

1972 births
Living people
American male pop singers
American male singer-songwriters
American hi-NRG musicians
Musicians from Cleveland
American LGBT musicians
Singer-songwriters from Ohio
21st-century American singers
Dance-pop musicians
21st-century American male singers